"Dragula" is a song and debut single co-written and recorded by American rock musician Rob Zombie. It was released in August 1998 as the lead single from his solo debut Hellbilly Deluxe. Since its release it has become Zombie's most recognizable song as a solo artist. It is also his best-selling song, and had sold over 717,000 copies in the U.S. by 2010. The song is based on the drag racer "DRAG-U-LA" from the sitcom The Munsters.

The audio clip "superstition, fear and jealousy" heard at the beginning of the song is a sample of dialogue from the 1960 horror film The City of the Dead (also known as Horror Hotel), and is spoken by Christopher Lee.

The song also appears on Rob Zombie's Past, Present & Future, the greatest hits album The Best of Rob Zombie. The original single included a big beat remix of the song by Charlie Clouser, entitled the "Hot Rod Herman" remix (in reference to the Munsters episode), which is contained on American Made Music to Strip By (under the name Si Non Oscillas, Noli Tintinnare Mix). Additionally, it appeared on the soundtracks for video games, films and TV shows.

Background and writing
Zombie told Billboard magazine that the title came from the name of Grandpa Munster's eponymous dragster DRAG-U-LA on The Munsters. He goes on to say that it "was a classic show with great comic characters. Strangely enough, 'Dragula' was one of the last songs finished for the record. It fell together really fast and worked, but it could just as easily not [have] been on the record."

Music video
The music video shows Rob Zombie driving the Munster Koach (not the actual Dragula racing car) with various shots of the band members and different scenes from movies, e.g. Dr. Jekyll and Mr. Hyde at the beginning of the video and the killer robot from the old movie chapter serial The Phantom Creeps. It achieved heavy rotation on MTV following the huge success of the album. The video also appears in the film Idle Hands.

Releases

Covers
The song was covered by Mitchell Sigman for The Electro-Industrial Tribute to Rob Zombie in 2002. It was also covered by gothic metalcore band Motionless in White in 2009 and remixed by electronic rock band Crosses for the album Mondo Sex Head in 2012. Singer-songwriter Lissie covered the song for the horror film Haunt (2019).

In 2021, comedian Shane Gillis performed a cover of the song at Skankfest South.

Personnel
 Rob Zombie – vocals
 Riggs – guitars
 Blasko – bass
 Tempesta – drums

Additional personnel
 Rob Zombie – lyrics, artwork, music
 Tom Baker – mastering
 Paul DeCarli – additional programming
 Frank Gryner – additional engineering
 Scott Humphrey – production, engineering, mixing, programming
 Chris Lord-Alge – additional mixing

Charts

Certifications

In popular culture 
 The Hot Rod Herman remix version of the song originally appeared in the 1999 Warner Bros. film The Matrix. It was later heard in several video games including Sled Storm, Jet Set Radio, Gran Turismo 2, and Twisted Metal 4. In addition, the latter franchise featured the original version in Twisted Metal and in the 2012 reboot.
 The song is featured in the film Idle Hands, and in the TV shows Daria, King of the Hill, Alias and The Flash.

See also
 Trollhättan school attack, a 2015 mass stabbing in Trollhattan, Sweden whose perpetrator played "Dragula" on his phone during the attack

References

External links
 

Rob Zombie songs
1998 debut singles
1998 songs
Songs about cars
Songs about television
Songs written by Scott Humphrey
Songs written by Rob Zombie
Geffen Records singles
Halloween songs
The Matrix (franchise) music
The Munsters